Arts Center station is a train station in Atlanta, Georgia, serving the Red and Gold lines of the Metropolitan Atlanta Rapid Transit Authority (MARTA) rail system. It is the northernmost of three MARTA stations that serve Midtown Atlanta, the others being Midtown and North Avenue.

Arts Center is an underground station with four levels: the platform level, the mezzanine level with fare gates facing onto West Peachtree Street, bus bays for bus feeder routes, and the upper level which is located across the street from the Woodruff Arts Center. This is the seventh-busiest station in the MARTA system, handling an average of 6,605 entries per weekday.

Arts Center is MARTA rail's primary connecting point to Peachtree station, Atlanta's current Amtrak intercity rail station, located approximately one mile to the north. MARTA's Route 110 bus to Buckhead provides direct service from Arts Center to Peachtree station and points north.

There is also a Zipcar parked in the parking lot.

Station layout

History
The Arts Center Station was opened on December 18, 1982, the same day as the Midtown Station. It served as the northern terminus for both the Gold and Red Lines(at that time called the Northeast-South Line and North-South Line, respectively) until December 15, 1984, when the Brookhaven/Oglethorpe and Lindbergh Center Stations became the new Gold and Red Lines northern terminus, respectively until future expansion expanded the lines yet again.

Just north of the Arts Center Station is a stub provision for the unbuilt Northwest Line, which was originally intended to run to Cobb County, but when Cobb County failed to pass a referendum for the 1% sales tax necessary to participate in MARTA, the line was truncated to a two-station spur serving the Brookwood neighborhood and Northside Drive. Eventually, the proposed branch was cancelled in favor of expanding the Red Line (then the North-South line) past the Buckhead station to Sandy Springs, and Dunwoody.

Nearby landmarks & popular destinations
High Museum of Art
Museum of Design Atlanta
Breman Jewish Heritage Museum
Woodruff Arts Center
Center for Puppetry Arts
Center Stage Atlanta
14th Street Playhouse
Atlanta Symphony Orchestra
Alliance Theatre
Ansley Park
Piedmont Park
Atlantic Station
Colony Square
Promenade Building
EarthLink headquarters
One Atlantic Center
Savannah College of Art and Design, Atlanta Campus

Bus routes
Buses provide service to Atlantic Station, Buckhead-Lenox-Phipps Plaza, Midtown, Underground Atlanta, Emory University Hospital Midtown and Piedmont Hospital through these routes:
 Route 27 - Cheshire Bridge Road
 Route 37 - Defoors Ferry Road
 Route 40 - Peachtree Street / Downtown
 Route 110 -  Peachtree Road / Buckhead
 ASAP - Free Shuttle Service to Atlantic Station

Connections with other transit systems

The CobbLinc - Cumberland Transfer Center, Marietta Transfer Center and Cumberland Mall
The Ride Gwinnett - Sugarloaf Mills (formerly Discover Mills) and the Mall of Georgia
The Georgia Regional Transportation Authority "Xpress" - Sugarloaf Mills (formerly Discover Mills) and the Mall of Georgia
The free bus service to the Atlanta Amtrak station

References

External links

MARTA Station Page
MARTA Guide
 West Peachtree Street NW entrance from Google Maps Street View

Gold Line (MARTA)
Red Line (MARTA)
Metropolitan Atlanta Rapid Transit Authority stations
Railway stations in the United States opened in 1982
Railway stations in Atlanta
1982 establishments in Georgia (U.S. state)
Railway stations located underground in Georgia (U.S. state)